The Taint (also called Doctor Who and the Taint) is an original novel credited to Michael Collier and based on the long-running British science fiction television series Doctor Who. The work features the Eighth Doctor and Sam. This also marks the introduction of a new companion, Fitz Kreiner.

Writing
The book was written by range editor Steve Cole. Repeating the arrangement done for the earlier Longest Day, Cole asked his friend, Michael Collier, for permission to publish under his name. Collier later became an author of historical fiction in his own right.

References

External links
The Cloister Library - The Taint

Reviews
The Whoniverse's review on The Taint

1999 British novels
1999 science fiction novels
Eighth Doctor Adventures
Novels by Stephen Cole